Clear Creek may refer to:

Hydronyms
Clear Creek (Alaska), a tributary of the Nenana River
Clear Creek (Colorado), a tributary of the South Platte River and the cradle of the Colorado Gold Rush
Clear Creek (Atlanta), a tributary of Peachtree Creek running through Atlanta, Georgia
Clear Creek (Eel River), a stream in Indiana
Clear Creek (Salt Creek), a tributary of Salt Creek running through Bloomington, Indiana
Clear Creek (Kentucky), a tributary of the Cumberland River
Clear Creek (Middle Fork John Day River), a tributary of Middle Fork John Day River, Oregon
Clear Creek (Nevada), a tributary of the Carson River west of Carson City
Clear Creek (Great Miami River), a tributary of the Great Miami River in southwestern Ohio
Clear Creek (Hocking River), a tributary of the Hocking River in southeastern Ohio
Clear Creek (Rocky River tributary), a stream in Cabarrus County, North Carolina
Clear Creek (Pennsylvania), a tributary of the Clarion River in northwestern Pennsylvania
Clear Creek (Harris County, Texas)
Clear Creek (Tennessee), a tributary of the Obed River
Clear Creek (Trinity River tributary), in Texas
Clear Creek (Utah), a tributary of the Sevier River noted for its Fremont culture archaeological finds
Clear Creek (Washington), a tributary of the Sauk River

In Arizona
East Clear Creek in Coconino County, Arizona, tributary to Clear Creek (Little Colorado River tributary)
Clear Creek (Little Colorado River tributary), in Coconino and Navajo Counties, Arizona
Clear Creek Reservoir, on Clear Creek at Winslow, north-central Arizona, Painted Desert
West Clear Creek, of the West Clear Creek Wilderness, central Arizona

In California
Clear Creek (Sacramento River tributary)
Clear Creek (San Benito River tributary)
Clear Creek (San Mateo County), a tributary of San Gregorio Creek

In Iowa
Clear Creek (Allamakee County, Iowa), a minor tributary of the Upper Mississippi River
Clear Creek (Iowa River), a stream in Iowa
Clear Creek (Squaw Creek tributary), a stream in Iowa

In Missouri
Clear Creek (Big River), a stream in Missouri
Clear Creek (Crooked Creek), a stream in Missouri
Clear Creek (Daviess County, Missouri), a stream in Missouri
Clear Creek (Fishing River), a stream in Missouri
Clear Creek (Little Bonne Femme Creek), a stream in Missouri
Clear Creek (Loutre River), a stream in Missouri
Clear Creek (Mineral Fork), a stream in Missouri
Clear Creek (North River), a stream in Missouri
Clear Creek (Osage River), a stream in southwest Missouri
Clear Creek (Sac River), a stream in Missouri

Toponyms

United States
Clear Creek Trail, on the north rim of the Grand Canyon
 Clear Creek, Lassen County, California
 Clear Creek, Siskiyou County, California
Clear Creek, Indiana, unincorporated place in Monroe County
Clear Creek, Minnesota, unorganized territory in Carlton County
 Clear Creek, a firing range complex at Fort Hood, Texas
League City, Texas, city formerly called "Clear Creek"
 Clear Creek, Texas, a.k.a. Hogtown, a former settlement in Hemphill County near Canadian, Texas
Clear Creek, Utah, virtual ghost town in Carbon County
Clear Creek, Virginia
Clear Creek, Wisconsin, a town
Clear Creek County, Colorado
Clear Creek Township (disambiguation)

Canada
Clear Creek, Ontario, an agricultural community in Norfolk County
Clear Creek (Lake Erie), a watershed administered by the Long Point Region Conservation Authority, that drains into Lake Erie

Nature Preserves
Clear Creek Metro Park, a nature preserve in Rockbridge, Ohio

Companies
Clear Creek Distillery, a producer of eau de vie in Portland, Oregon, United States

Monasteries
Monastery of Our Lady of the Annunciation of Clear Creek, a Benedictine Monastery near Hulbert, Oklahoma, United States

See also
Clear Branch (disambiguation)
Clear Fork (disambiguation)
Clear River (disambiguation)